Ocean Conference can refer to:

 United Nations Ocean Conference
 World Ocean Conference
 Arctic Ocean Conference

See also 
 Arctic Ocean Conference